Alexey Nikolaevitch Pleshakov (January 1, 1954). He was elected as the Head of the local government board of Dzerzhinsky on July 25, 2006 after Victor Dorkin was shot dead in early spring, 2006.

Graduated from Moscow Institute of Chemical Industry in (1976) and was assigned to Lyubertsy Science and Research Institute of Chemical Technology in Dzerzhinsky city. Worked on solid-state rocket fuel.

1997-2005 worked as the deputy of the Head of the local government board of Dzerzhinsky city (town-planning and municipal housing department).

Since September 2005 and until his recent election directed the department of Moscow region civil engineering ministry where he organized and coordinated construction of sport facilities (Moscow region Governor Program)

Awarded with the Moscow region Governor Medal "for his unexceptionable service" and with the badge "For the services he rendered for Dzerzhinsky town"

6 inventions, several science publications.

Married, three children.

External links 
Official website of Dzerzhinsky 
/ unofficial Dzerjinsky forum  

Pleshakov, Alexey Nikolaevitch
People from Dzerzhinsky, Moscow Oblast
Pleshakov, Alexey Nikolaevitch
Pleshakov, Alexey Nikolaevitch
D. Mendeleev University of Chemical Technology of Russia alumni